Statistics of L. League Cup in the 1996 season.

Overview
Yomiuri-Seiyu Beleza won the championship.

Results

Preliminary round

East

West

Final round

Semifinals
Yomiuri-Seiyu Beleza 2-1 Matsushita Electric Panasonic Bambina
Suzuyo Shimizu FC Lovely Ladies 0-2 Prima Ham FC Kunoichi

Third place match
Konomiya Speranza Osaka-Takatsuki|Matsushita Electric Panasonic Bambina 1-2 Suzuyo Shimizu FC Lovely Ladies

Final
Yomiuri-Seiyu Beleza 0-0 (pen 4-3) Prima Ham FC Kunoichi

References

Nadeshiko League Cup
1996 in Japanese women's football